Wang Dou (born 18 May 1993) is a Chinese hurdler who specializes in the 100 m distance. She won a bronze medal at the 2017 Asian Championships and placed fourth at the 2018 Asian Games.

References

Chinese female hurdlers
1993 births
Living people
Athletes (track and field) at the 2018 Asian Games
Asian Games competitors for China